is a Japan-exclusive Super Famicom fishing video game endorsed by the Japanese professional bass fisher Shigetaka Kashiwagi.

Summary
The object is to fish in a fictional lake in Japan and find as much black bass as possible and with as much weight as possible. Players must cast their fishing lures in the water in order to catch the fish swimming in the digitized body of water. Certain areas of the lake can be chosen and weather can also be a factor. When actually fishing, the player's virtual avatar can be seen casting a lure into the water. The fishing in the game is done from the morning hours to mid-afternoon. There are a variety of lures to choose from including sinkers and bobbers.

Reception
On release, Famitsu magazine scored the game a 22 out of 40.

References

1995 video games
Fishing video games
Japan-exclusive video games
Super Nintendo Entertainment System games
Super Nintendo Entertainment System-only games
VAP (company) games
Video games based on real people
Video games developed in Japan
Cultural depictions of fishers
Cultural depictions of Japanese men
Single-player video games